The Mithibai College of Arts, Chauhan Institute of Science & Amrutben Jivanlal College of Commerce and Economics is a college affiliated to the University of Mumbai. The college was established in 1961 in Vile Parle, Mumbai by Shri Vile Parle Kelavani Mandal. In 2018 it was granted autonomous status by UGC.

History
Mithibai College was established by Shri Vile Parle Kelavani Mandal   (SVKM) in 1961, as a part of the trust's silver jubilee celebration. The Mithibai College of Arts and Chauhan Institute of Science, commonly known as the main wing, was started first, and the Amrutben Jivanlal College of Commerce & Economics started 19 years later. Other courses including Bachelor of Management Studies, Bachelor of Science and Master of Science degree courses in biochemistry, biotechnology and computer science were subsequently introduced by the college. The college has grown to a student population of more than 32,000.

Dr. Rajpal Hande was the Principal of the institute. 
There is a 50% reservation for Gujarati speaking community and the conventional SC/ST/OBC/females reservation as per the government norms.

Rankings
It has consistently featured on the top 5 ranks in India Today College rankings for years 2017, 2018 and 2019.

Student college life

Sports

The college won the Guru Nanak General Championship Trophy of the University of Mumbai for 12 consecutive years.

Many of Mithibai's athletes have been representing the university, the state and also the country.

Many of them are the recipients of the prestigious Shri Shivchhatrapati Award of the State and the Arjuna Award at the National level.

Mithibai Kshitij
Mithibai Kshitij is the college's annual cultural festival. It is a 4-day festival, with more than 500 colleges being invited every year. Events include competitions, workshops, seminars, exhibitions, amateur and professional shows which are conducted at various SVKM venues. Mithibai Kshitij is mainly known for its Pronights (Pro-Nites), Artists and bands like Juggy D, Raghu Dixit, Pentagram, Kailash Kher, Hard Kaur, Akriti Kakkar, Tochi Raina, Jazzy-B, Vishakha and many others have performed on the Jashoda Rang Mandir Ground's Stage in Mithibai Kshitij.

In 2011, The Dirty Picture movie's crew including Vidya Balan, Bappi Lahiri, Vishal–Shekhar, Sunidhi Chauhan, Emraan Hashmi, Tusshar Kapoor and a few others enlightened the stage.

In 2012, they had Punjabi International Artist Jazzy-B along with Ramji Gulati. On 12 December 2012, they had an Electronic Dance Music night, with a line up; DJ Anish Sood B2B Lost Stories (DJs), opened by DJ SHAAN.

This festival is organized by the students of Mithibai College, The Core Committee, Committee Members and Volunteers (approximately 600 students) are a part of it. 19 Department's of Mithibai Kshitij are divided into two types; Admin and Events, which mainly consists of Marketing, Public Relations, Computers, Performing Arts, Literary Arts, Film Fest, Pro-nites etc.

Mithibai Kshitij has started a trend of international female EDM artists since 2013. DJ Teri Miko (2013), DJ Da Candy (2014), DJ Sheherezade (2015). It has also promoted many Bollywood movies till date; The Dirty Picture, Jackpot (the 2013 film), Krrish 3, Heartless, Badlapur, Baaji, Brothers(2015), Shaandar, Angry Indian Goddesses are some of them.

It was launched by Hrithik Roshan and Priyanka Chopra in 2013 and by Akshay Kumar, Siddharth Malhotra and Jacqueline Fernandez in 2015. Both the launches were in the form of a talk show which was hosted by film critic Rajeev Masand and broadcast by CNN IBN.

The theme of the festival in 2015 was launched by Shahid Kapoor and Alia Bhatt along with the launch of their song "Shaam Shaandar" from the film Shaandaar.

National Cadet Corps Brave Hearts

During the academic year 2002-2003 the enrolment was 20 for boys and girls. The college had 4 cadets in III year, 6 cadets II year and 10 cadets in the I year. Mithibai's girl cadets Ms. Simi Sound attended Group Selection Pre-RDC and RDC camp at Mumbai, Ahmednagar and Delhi. The five cadets attended various camps during the year. Almost all the cadets have cleared the B-Certificate or the C-Certificate examination of the NCC.

National Service Scheme

The National Service Scheme, with its three pillars of Seva, Sadbhavana and Satkarma, works with social projects and has also played a major role in upholding the down trodden and disaster stricken and instills moral values in its members. The motto of the scheme is to evoke in every individual the feeling of ‘Not me, But you' and involve college youth in social service.

Infrastructure: Library: The library of Mithibai College (Jitendra Library) has a copious collection of books, encyclopedia, journals, CDs and other resource material. It is centrally air-conditioned and supported with modern technology like Wi-Fi and digital video recording cameras. Library users can access Online Databases through Wi-Fi. Library shares its resources under inter-library loan with other libraries of SVKM.  Online Catalogue of books and non-book material is available through the Union Web OPAC. At the Reprography centre, the students can photocopy and print papers at concessional rates. A grand Library is the backbone of every institution of higher education. The College Library has been renovated to a state of the art, fully air conditioned avatar having E-Library Facility. The Library holds more than 60,000 books on different fields of learning. These also include journals, periodicals, encyclopedias, hand books and books on general knowledge. The library premises are spacious and most suitable for all the students as well as erudite scholars seeking knowledge.
Activity Room: The College has acquired a vibrant atmosphere due to co-curricular and extension activities. It is a place to develop creative thoughts in young minds with emphasis on Cultural milieu.
Health Services: The College has a provision of a Doctor on Campus to attend to staff and students.
Canteen: The canteen is very spacious and offers hygienic food at affordable rates. Besides this there is also a Cake Shop.
Gymkhana: The College has a very good Gymkhana which is ideal for indoor games such as TT, Chess and Carrom.  
Class-rooms: The College has evolved effective method of teaching in the high-tech class-rooms which are centrally air-conditioned and have good seating and lighting. Smart Board, LCD’s and OHP’s  are used as teaching aids. 
Auditoriums: Juhu Jagruti Hall and Mithibai Seminar Hall are excellent centrally air-conditioned halls, technically well-equipped with state of the art acoustics, light and sound facilities. Its seating capacity is 114 approximately.
Laboratories are spacious, well equipped with latest apparatus and sophisticated equipments. Most of the labs are High-Tech labs and used for Research work.
Lifts/ Ramps /Wash-rooms/Water Coolers: These facilities are available in common floor-wise to suit every ones needs. Proper arrangements with great precautions are made for the differently able and persons with special needs.
Security and Safety: The College offers a very safe and secured environment with Close Circuit Cameras installed at all important places and round the clock security. The college also has fire fighting equipments in place.

Student Council

The college has duly constituted Students' Council with Principal as chairman, one lecturer nominated by the Principal, NCC officer, NSS programme officer, Director of Sports, One meritorious student from each class and outstanding student from each of the following activities NSS, Sports, NCC, cultural activities and two female students nominated by the Principal. Tenure of the Students' Council is one academic year.

Notable alumni

 Prakriti Kakar, Singer
 Sukriti Kakar, Singer
 Suhasi Dhami, Actress
 Drashti Dhami, Actress 
 Digangana Suryavanshi, Actress
 Bobby Deol, Actor 
 Esha Deol, Actress
 Ajay Devgn, Actor 
 Ashutosh Gowarikar, Film Director
 Rakhi Sawant, Actress
 Avadhoot Gupte, music director and Singer
 Jyothika, Actress 
 Kajol, Actress 
Gulki Joshi, Actress 
 Ekta Kapoor, Film and Television Producer
 Kareena Kapoor, Actress 
 Shahid Kapoor, Actor
 Boman Irani, Actor
 Rani Mukerji, Actress 
 Karan Patel, Actor 
 Renuka Shahane, Actress
 Lubna Salim, Actress
 Vatsal Sheth, Actor
 Namrata Shirodkar, Actress
 Shreyas Talpade, Actor 
 Raveena Tandon, Actress
 Rahul Vaidya, Singer
 Satish Rajwade, Film Director
 Mohsin Khan, Actor
 Jubin Nautiyal, Singer 
 Fatima Sana Shaikh, Actress
 Rahul Kamerkar, Lawyer and Author
 Shreya Bugade, Actress
 Vivek oberoi, Actor
 Amrita Prakash, Actor
 Bosco–Caesar, Choreography duo
 Parvathy Omanakuttan, Actress, Model, Miss India 2008

See also 

 Shri Vile Parle Kelavani Mandal (SVKM)
 Hyderabad (Sindh) National Collegiate Board
 University of Mumbai
 HSNC University
 SVKM's NMIMS

References

External links
 
 Mithibai Kshitij Official Website

 
Educational institutions established in 1961
Universities and colleges in Mumbai
1961 establishments in Maharashtra
Colleges in India
Affiliates of the University of Mumbai